Karvan FK was an Azerbaijani football club based in Yevlakh, that participated in the Azerbaijan First Division. It was the first Azerbaijan club to pass the first qualification stage in the UEFA Cup.

History

Football in Yevlakh 
The first football club established in Yevlakh, one of the biggest cities in Azerbaijan, was FC Avtomobilchi, in 1990. The team participated in the Soviet Second League and the Azerbaijan Premier League twice. FC Avtomobilchi relegated after the 1993–94 season, and dissolved. The second football team in Yevlakh was founded 10 years later, in 2004.

Golden years 
Karvan immediately admitted to the 2004–05 Azerbaijan Top League. The club got off to a good start, finishing third in the 2004–05 season and second in the 2005–06 season. In addition, they reached the national cup final in 2005–06, but lost to FK Karabakh, 2–1. Karvan played in the Intertoto Cup in 2005. In the 2006–07 season the club participated in the UEFA Cup and passed to the second qualifying round.

Financial difficulties and relegation 
Karvan stopped at the most unexpected moment. As management reduced funding, the best players left the team immediately after coach Yunis Hüseynov's resignation. In the 2007–08 season Karvan finished 11th, and club executives were forced to ask Huseynov to return. But no miracle happened, and in the 2009–10 season the team relegated to the Azerbaijan First Division. In 2012, the club's owners announced that the club would be dissolved and they would not be participating in the Azerbaijan First Division.

On 21 August 2013, it was announced the club would be reformed and it would participate in First Division. Even though, on 18 August 2014, the club again dissolved due to financial problems.

Stadium 

Karvan's home ground is Yevlakh Stadium, which has a capacity of 5,000.

League and domestic cup history

European cup history 
As of December, 2008.

Managers 
 Yunis Huseynov (2004–2005)
 Fuat Yaman (2005)
 Yunis Huseynov (2005–2007)
 Tabriz Hasanov (2007–2008)
 Yunis Huseynov (2008–2010)
 Vidadi Rzayev (2010–2011)
 Zakir Mahmudov (2011–2012)
 Kanan Karimov (2013–2014)

References

External links 
 Official website
 FK Karvan at PFL.AZ

Karvan
Association football clubs established in 2004
2004 establishments in Azerbaijan
2014 disestablishments in Azerbaijan
Defunct football clubs in Azerbaijan
Association football clubs disestablished in 2014
Association football clubs established in 1990
1990 establishments in Azerbaijan
Association football clubs disestablished in 1994
1994 disestablishments in Azerbaijan
Association football clubs disestablished in 2012
2012 disestablishments in Azerbaijan
Association football clubs established in 2013
2013 establishments in Azerbaijan